Thomas Frederick Charles Harvey (born 4 February 1980) is an English former first-class cricketer.

Harvey was born in February 1980 at Chatham, Kent. He played for the Kent Cricket Board in the 2002 MCCA Knockout Trophy. While studying at university in Cambridge, Harvey made a single appearance in first-class cricket for Cambridge UCCE against Middlesex at Fenner's in 2004. He took four wickets in the match with his right-arm off break bowling, while with the bat he was dismissed by Ed Joyce in the Cambridge UCCE first-innings for 21 runs. He also played minor counties cricket for Cambridgeshire from 2004–10, making nineteen appearances in the Minor Counties Championship and thirteen appearances in the MCCA Knockout Trophy.

References

External links

1980 births
Living people
People from Chatham, Kent
English cricketers
Kent Cricket Board cricketers
Cambridge MCCU cricketers
Cambridgeshire cricketers